Brott Music Festival presents annual classical, jazz, chamber, pops, multidisciplinary, and education concerts in Hamilton, Ontario, Canada. The festival was founded by late conductor Boris Brott in 1988. The orchestra in residence is the National Academy Orchestra of Canada, Canada's only professional orchestral training program. It is also home to BrottOpera, a training program for Canadian emerging opera singers. Its current artistic director is Alain Trudel.

Location 
The Brott Music Festival's catchment area is the 905 WEST area and extends from the Durham region east to Metropolitan Toronto west to the Niagara region, and south of Hamilton to Haldimand-Norfolk.

History 
The festival began as a way to provide cultural activity during the summer months in Hamilton, Ontario, and was founded as a two-week summer music festival in 1988 by conductor Boris Brott. Its budget has increased from $50,000 to under $1.5 million, and it has become Canada's largest orchestral music festival. It is praised in music circles for emphasizing nontraditional and multidisciplinary performances. Brott draws musicians from across Canada. The orchestra in residence is the National Academy Orchestra of Canada, which is a training program for aspiring professional musicians. The NAO is the only program of its kind in Canada and is similar to the Orchestra of the New World in Florida.

BMF's main activities take place in June, July, and August annually, but the festival also presents educational concerts for elementary students at Hamilton Place every autumn and three performances of Handel's Messiah every December.

BMF performs in concert hall settings such as Hamilton Place, Dofasco Centre for the Performing Arts, Mohawk College's McIntyre Theatre and the Glenn Gould Studio in Toronto. It also performs in  churches, including Christ's Church Cathedral, Melrose United, St. Christopher's Anglican in Burlington, West Highland Baptist, and St. John's Anglican in Ancaster. Other venues include the Royal Botanical Gardens, Dundurn Castle, Whitehern Museum, and the Art Gallery of Hamilton.

Boris Brott and educational programs 
Boris Brott was also former principal Education & Family Conductor at the National Arts Centre Orchestra in Ottawa, music director and Conductor Laureate of New West Symphony in Los Angeles and the McGill Chamber Orchestra in Montreal. He founded Brott Music Festival in 1988 and the National Academy Orchestra of Canada in 1989. The festival re-introduced music education performances to Hamilton in 1999. Since then, the NAO has performed for over 144,000 schoolchildren from across southern Ontario. It is estimated that Boris Brott introduced classical music to one million children during his career. He has written over 300 scripted children's concerts, such as Welcome Bach, Meet Mr. Beethoven; Trick or Treat to a Wicked Beat; There's an Animal in My Orchestra; Boris the Explorer: So You Want to Sing?; and J.S. Bach Meets Glenn Gould. Brott Music Education Concert highlights over the past nine years have included:

 The Sophia Diaries: A Musical Exploration of Canada in the 1840s
 The Underground Railroad: A Musical Journey narrated by Hon. Lincoln Alexander
 Animal Crackers with Ottawa Dance Studio
 Music in Space with astronaut Marc Garneau
 From Ghost Ships to Space Ships: Musical Explorations with astronaut Roberta Bondar
 Music & The Inuit Spirit with throat singers, drum dancers, and soapstone carvers
 Melodies & Myths: A celebration of Aboriginal Music featuring the world premiere of Barbara Croall Assiginaak's Mi'degaawen

The second category is for middle school grades 4-8 and is based on curriculum worked out with teachers and arts consultants on the BMF Education Committee. These programs can be based around the life of a composer and often feature an actor portraying Mozart, Beethoven, or Dvorak. Programming selections must contain excerpts of varying styles and colours representative of that particular composer. Programs inculcate contemporary Canadian composition since they illustrate the influence that specific composer may have had on another contemporary Canadian composer.

Timeline 
1988 BMF founded by late Artistic Director Boris Brott in 10-day Festival in Hamilton 
1989, Brott founds the NAO, a mentor-apprentice training program, with masterclasses & seminars, prepares its graduates for realities of life as professional artists. The NAO becomes BMF's orchestra in residence. 
1995, BMF begins first of its annual NAO “runouts” which enrich other Ontario festivals with orchestral repertoire & provide touring experience for students
1997 - BMF gives first annual concert on front lawn at the newly restored Windermere House at Lake Rousseau, Ontario
1998, NAO recognized as a National Training School by the Department of Canadian Heritage 
1999, BMF expands programming to add Children's Education Concert series at Hamilton Place & Handel's Messiah to its annual performance calendar
2000, NAO profiled in a documentary on CBC's The National. Brott conducts Bernstein's Mass at the Vatican for Pope John Paul II
2000 - NAO and BMF garner national attention with appearances by former Prime Minister of Canada Kim Campbell who narrates a performance with her spouse, Broadway star Hershey Felder
2002, NAO performs for Pope John Paul II & 800,000 for World Youth Day in Toronto
2005 - World premiere of Barbara Croall Assiginaak's Midawewe' Igan - The Sound of the Drum".
2006 - Canada's first person in space, astronaut Marc Garneau guest stars in Music & Space. Members of the NAO and an actor portraying Mozart visit Holy Family Elementary School to say Happy 250th Anniversary to Mozart 
2007 - 20th Anniversary celebration of BMF. Mahler's 8th Symphony of a Thousand is performed as 20th anniversary summer finale with an orchestra of 120, a choir of 250, eight soloists, The Brantford Children's Chorus, and eight off-stage brass. Over 30 of the 120 orchestral musicians were NAO alumni who returned from all over Canada to join in the celebration. Concert is sold out and receives a 6-minute standing ovation and five curtain calls. It was only the work's eighth performance in Canadian history and a first for Hamilton.
2008 World premieres of BMF-commissioned Dagwaagin (It is Autumn) by Barbara Croall Assiginaak and Omar Daniel's Alouette Variations: A Canadian Young Person's Guide to the Orchestra. 
2009 NAO performs for Secretary of State Hillary Clinton 
2014, BMF collaborates with Canadian superstar rock band Arkells (2015) for a secret a pop-up performance
2014, BrottOpera & its Emerging Artists Program founded after the collapse of Opera Hamilton 
2015, NAO first orchestra in 10 years to play at the JUNO Awards & performs for closing ceremonies of Pan Am Games 
2020, BMF receives national media attention for a successful pivot to online training during COVID pandemic lockdown
2021, BMF performs five sold out drive-in/outdoor concerts in accordance with COVID protocols
May 2022, BMF names Alain Trudel its new artistic director after the sudden & tragic loss of Boris Brott

Awards and honours
BMF received the Tourism Ambassador Award from Tourism Hamilton and Tourism Business of the Year (under 50,000). Boris Brott was awarded the Order of Ontario in 2006, Lifetime Achievement Awards from Tourism Hamilton and the City of Hamilton Arts Awards in 2007, and the National Child Day Award from the Canadian Institute for Child Health in Ottawa in November 2007. In May 2006, he was voted one of the top five Greatest Hamiltonians of all time by readers of The Hamilton Spectator.

References

External links
 Official website

Recurring events established in 1988
Classical music festivals in Canada
Jazz festivals in Canada
Music festivals in Ontario
1988 establishments in Ontario
Festivals in Hamilton, Ontario